A diaphragm arch is a transverse  wall-bearing arch  forming a partial wall dividing a vault or a ceiling into compartments.

When used under a wooden roof, it has the advantage of providing  a partial  firebreak.   It was first used in Roman Syria, during the 2nd century AD.

See also
 Islamic architecture
 Kucheh

References

Arches and vaults